Viking's Rage is a swinging ship ride at Canada's Wonderland. Viking's Rage was the first of three swinging pendulum rides that operated at the park. Today, there are only two pendulum rides at the park after Jet Scream was removed to make room for WindSeeker. The ride is also very similar to Jet Scream (now removed) with the only difference of The Rage not going upside down.
The ride opened in 1981 s Viking's Rage, but was renamed The Rage in 1997. This name change lasted up until 2019, in which the park reverted it back to Viking's Rage.

Structure
Viking's Rage is mainly made up of 4 different parts. The first part is the "ship" itself. This is where the riders sit during the ride. The second part are the four supports that hold the entire ride up. They hold the "ship" and what the "ship" hangs on. The third part is what the "ship" hangs on. It is made up of several different parts and involves anything above the "ship" excluding the supports. The fourth (and final) part are the two mechanical wheels underneath the "ship". This is what pushes the "ship" forward whenever the "ship" passes over the wheels.

Ride experience
For a total ride time of about 2 minutes and 30 seconds, the "ship" begins by swinging higher and higher every time it passes over the wheels underneath (Still staying under 90-degrees). Once the ride begins to stop, the wheels act like brakes which slow down the "ship" every time it passes over the wheels until the ride comes to a complete stop.

References

External links
 Official The Rage page

Amusement rides introduced in 1981
Cedar Fair attractions
Amusement rides manufactured by HUSS Park Attractions